Live from Austin, TX is a live album by American singer-songwriter Guy Clark, released in 2007. It was recorded during a 1989 taping of the television show Austin City Limits.

Track listing
All songs by Guy Clark unless otherwise noted.
 "Texas 1947" – 3:24
 "L.A. Freeway (Pack Up All Your Dishes)" – 4:27
 "The Carpenter" – 3:26
 "Old Friends" (Guy Clark, Susanna Clark, Richard Dobson) – 3:52
 "Come From the Heart" (Susanna Clark, Richard Leigh) – 3:05
 "I'm All Through Throwing Good Love After Bad" (Clark, Leigh) – 2:39
 "Randall Knife" – 4:28
 "Immigrant Eyes" (Clark, Murrah) – 4:41
 "Desperados Waiting for a Train" – 4:40
 "The Last Gunfighter Ballad" – 2:56
 "New Cut Road" – 4:14
 "Better Days" – 3:20
 "Homegrown Tomatoes" – 4:53
 "To Live Is to Fly" (Townes Van Zandt) – 3:51
 "Texas Cookin'" – 4:07

Personnel
Guy Clark – vocals, guitar
Stuart Duncan – fiddle
Edgar Meyer – bass

Production notes
Jerry Tubb – mastering
Chet Himes – mixing
Lee Myers Jr. – engineer
David Hough – engineer
Scott Newton – photography
Sue Meyer – design

References

Guy Clark albums
2007 live albums
New West Records live albums
Austin City Limits